Amudat is a town in Northern Uganda. It is the main municipal, administrative and commercial center of Amudat District and the district headquarters are located there. The district is named after the town.

Location
Amudat is located in Amudat District, Karamoja sub-region, in Northern Uganda. The coordinates of the town are:01 57 00N, 34 57 00E (Latitude:1°57'08.0"N, 34°56'40.0"E (Latitude:1.952223; Longitude:34.944445).

Overview
Amudat was selected to be the headquarters of the newly established Amudat District, which was created by Act of Parliament and began functioning on 1 July 2010. The town is the most eastward of all the 111 district capitals in Uganda.

Population
, it was estimated that the population of Amudat was about 1,900.

Points of interest
The following points of interest lie within the town limits or near its borders:
 The headquarters of Amudat District Administration
 The offices of Amudat Town Council
 Amudat Hospital - A 100-bed public hospital, administered by the Church Missionary Society
 Amudat Central Market

See also

References

External links
  400 Children In Amudat Flee Their Homes For Fear of FGM

Populated places in Northern Region, Uganda
Cities in the Great Rift Valley
Karamoja